Reynel Montoya Jaramillo (born 19 November 1959) is a Colombian former professional road cyclist.

Major results

1982
 1st Young rider classification Vuelta a Colombia
1983
 1st  Overall Vuelta a Antioquia
 1st Stage 2 (TTT) Vuelta a Colombia
 1st Stage 2a (TTT) Clásico RCN
1984
 1st  Mountains classification, Tour de l'Avenir
 4th Overall Vuelta a Colombia
1st Stage 4 (TTT)
1986
 1st  Overall Vuelta a Antioquia
 5th Overall Clásico RCN
 10th Overall Vuelta a Colombia
1st Stage 2a (TTT)
1987
 1st  Road race, National Road Championships
 1st  Overall Vuelta a Antioquia
 1st  Overall Vuelta a Cundinamarca
 6th Overall Vuelta a Colombia
1st Points classification
1st Mountains classification
1st Combined classification
1988
 1st  Road race, National Road Championships
 7th Overall Vuelta a Colombia
1989
 1st  Road race, National Road Championships
 3rd Overall Route du Sud
 3rd Overall Vuelta a Colombia
1st Points classification
1st Stages 3 & 5
 7th Overall Clásico RCN
1st Stages 1, 4 & 7
1990
 1st Overall Clásica del Quindio
 1st Stage 1 Clásico RCN

Grand Tour general classification results timeline

References

1959 births
Living people
Colombian male cyclists
Vuelta a Colombia stage winners
Sportspeople from Antioquia Department
20th-century Colombian people